Hennadiy Krasylnykov (born 30 March 1977) is a retired male weightlifter from Ukraine. He twice competed for his native country at the Summer Olympics (2000 and 2004) in the men's super heavyweight  division (+ 105 kg), finishing in 9th and 4th place in the final standings.

During the 2022 Russian invasion of Ukraine, Krasylnykov was arrested over alleged spotting in favour of Russian army in Chuhuiv.

References

Sources

1977 births
Living people
Ukrainian male weightlifters
Olympic weightlifters of Ukraine
Weightlifters at the 2000 Summer Olympics
Weightlifters at the 2004 Summer Olympics
20th-century Ukrainian people
21st-century Ukrainian people